Flamer is a semi-autobiographical graphic novel by Mike Curato. It is set in 1995, in a Boy Scouts summer camp, and tells the story of Aiden, who is bullied for his appearance, including acting in a manner considered stereotypical of gay men. Curato was a scout and based his experience as a closeted teenager to write the novel.

The book was published in 2020 by Henry Holt and Company and was praised both for its emotional story and its artistic choices, such as the use of red tones for emotional moments while being mostly drawn in black and white. Flamer received a Lambda Literary Award in 2021 in the young adult category.

Plot 
The novel is set in 1995, when Aiden Navarro, a 14-year-old Filipino American teenager, goes through the last week of a Boy Scouts summer camp, before having to return home. Having just finished Catholic middle school, where he was constantly bullied for being overweight, biracial, and queer, Navarro is excited for his trip to the summer camp, where he has always felt appreciated by his friends as a good scout. Aiden considers the Boys Scout camp to be a safe space, where things are peaceful and predictable. He also enjoys going to the summer camp since it means being far from his abusive father.

Things are different this year, as the other boys he is spending time with are going through puberty, and spend their time trying to prove to each other who is more manly, which includes the use of homophobic slurs. Although Aiden attempts to be like these boys, his inability to fit in leaves him especially frustrated and upset.

While there, Aiden also writes to his pen pal, a girl named Violet, with whom he is very close and feels comfortable sharing more intimate subjects. In his letters, Aiden talks about the things he was taught in Catholic school, how homosexuality is morally wrong, and his romantic feelings for another camper, Elias.

Throughout the week, Navarro attempts to suppress his feelings towards Elias and himself, which leads to self-loathing and suicide ideation. Although Aiden manages to fight off the negative thoughts and emotions inside him in the end, he leaves the scout camp with the understanding life for him wouldn't be easy.

Major themes 
One of the subjects present in Mike Curato's debut graphic novel is the toxic masculinity and homophobia that Navarro contends with, which happens during his time at the Catholic school and while at the summer camp. This is also portrayed when Aiden attempts to fit in with his pubescent campmates by acting heterossexually and imitating their "homophobic, macho behavior".

Flamer also deals with struggles of identity, as the main character, who had a Catholic upbringing, does not fully understand his feelings towards other boys, and has trouble accepting his own queerness, as he was taught that being gay is considered a sin. The bullying suffered by Aiden in school and during the summer camp causes his self-hatred to increase, which eventually leads to a breaking point where he begins to have suicidal thoughts.

Background 
Mike Curato began writing the script for Flamer in 2011.

Aiden's experience includes being bullied for his effeminate voice and insinuations of being gay, which is based on Curato's own experiences as a closeted scout. Part of Curato's writing process involved looking at his old journals, sketchbooks, and photographs to relive old memories. He also had access to the letters he sent to his old pen pal, ranging from 1992 to the early 2000s. The same pen pal served as inspiration for Violet.

Curato lacked experience producing works similar to comic books. After sending the mockup for the novel to his agent, he had to add around thirty new pages to the final version for lack of space for the speech balloons. This alteration led to him expanding on the original story.}}

Reception 
The writing and design in Flamer were commended for the author's ability in conveying the emotions felt by the main character to the reader. In his review for The Horn Book Magazine, Roger Sutton mentions how the book "speaks so well to those kids currently undergoing the ordeal." Sutton also comments on the slow build-up of the story, showing the activities Aiden partakes in the camp, which "fully pull readers into Aiden's psyche". The review published by School Library Journal mentions the struggle that Aiden goes through in accepting himself by instead imitating the "macho behavior of other campers" to appear straight.

In her review for the NPR, Juanita Giles mentions the main character showing signs of not being able to accept being queer, and calls it "an astounding moment in an already astounding story." Giles also comments on the ending of the novel, and how, instead of all of Aiden's problems being solved, it shows him persevering over the challenges life had imposed on him. A review for the Bulletin of the Center for Children's Books goes over the suicidal ideation scene, and the powerful style shown by Curato in it. They also praise the "emotional wallop" caused by Curato's narration of Aiden's life and his use of "incendiary" colors alongside the black ink.

The Publishers Weekly review mentions how through the use of "straightforward, thick-lined art", the author "interweaves surrealistic, emotionally charged moments". Kirkus Reviews, in its verdict, called Flamer "a story that will be read and reread, and for some, it will be the defining book of their adolescence." Sarah Hunter, for The Booklist, wrote: "Masterfully nuanced and stunningly told, this is visual storytelling at its finest."

Curato's use of black and white for the everyday moments and red and orange tones for moments of intense emotion was specially praised by reviewers. Sarah Hunter writes that "deft artwork meticulously balances between blazing feelings and quiet contemplation." For the School Library Journal, the usage of colors to signify Aiden's "passion, rage, desire, and shame" is made even more explicit against the black and white illustrations. Kirkus Reviews called the illustrations "timeless moments of a remembered childhood." Roger Sutton also commented about the use of smaller panels for the storytelling, and the "full-page and double-page spreads for big moments", calling it "wonderfully effective."

Awards and honors 
Flamer won the Lambda Literary Award for Children's and Young Adult Literature in its 33rd edition, held in 2021. 

The book was also in The Horn Book Magazines list of the best books of 2020, which states that it "winningly captures the joys of camp and young love while at the same time exploring the hopes and fears of the human heart."

Controversy 
Flamer has been subject to widespread criticism by proponents of an unprecedented wave of book banning in the United States. PEN America reported that it had been banned in schools in at least six states during the 2021-2022 school year.

Flamer was listed among 52 books banned by the Alpine School District following the implementation of Utah law H.B. 374, “Sensitive Materials In Schools," many of which were considered to contain pornographic material according to the new law, which defines porn using the following criteria:

 "The average person" would find that the material, on the whole, "appeals to prurient interest in sex"
 The material "is patently offensive in the description or depiction of nudity, sexual conduct, sexual excitement, sadomasochistic abuse, or excretion"
 The material, on the whole, "does not have serious literary, artistic, political or scientific value."
After a district parent filed a criminal complaint in August 2022 against Flamer''s inclusion in the Jordan High School library in Katy, Texas, district police temporarily removed the book for an investigation. The book had already been deemed appropriate for high schools by a book review committee in March, and the police concurred with the committee's evaluation of the book's content.

References 

2020 graphic novels
2020 children's books
2020s LGBT novels
American autobiographical novels
American bildungsromans
American LGBT novels
Gay male teen fiction
Henry Holt and Company books
Lambda Literary Award-winning works
LGBT-related graphic novels
Censored books
Censorship of LGBT issues